Albert Linder (born 8 November 1877) was a Swiss footballer who played for FC Basel during the 1890s. He played mainly in the position as striker, but also as midfielder.

Football career
FC Basel was founded on 15 November 1893 and Linder joined the club about two years later, during their 1895–96 season. Linder played his first game for the club in the home game on 23 November 1895 as Basel played their first ever game against Anglo-American Club Zürich.

Linder stayed with the team for three seasons and during this time he played 13 games for Basel without scoring a goal.

Notes

Footnotes

References

Sources
 Rotblau: Jahrbuch Saison 2017/2018. Publisher: FC Basel Marketing AG. 
 Die ersten 125 Jahre. Publisher: Josef Zindel im Friedrich Reinhardt Verlag, Basel. 
 Verein "Basler Fussballarchiv" Homepage
(NB: Despite all efforts, the editors of these books and the authors in "Basler Fussballarchiv" have failed to be able to identify all the players, their date and place of birth or date and place of death, who played in the games during the early years of FC Basel)

FC Basel players
Swiss men's footballers
Association football midfielders
Association football forwards
1877 births
Date of death missing